The 1966 Western Kentucky Hilltoppers football team represented Western Kentucky University as a member of the Ohio Valley Conference (OVC) during the 1966 NCAA College Division football season. Led by ninth-year head coach Nick Denes, the Hilltoppers compiled an overall record of 5–5 with a mark of 3–4 in conference play, for sixth place in the OVC. The team's captain was Jack Crangle.

Schedule

References

Western Kentucky
Western Kentucky Hilltoppers football seasons
Western Kentucky Hilltoppers football